Eleodes suturalis is a species of darkling beetle. As currently known, it is endemic to the United States. Their range extends from South Dakota to Texas and west to southwestern Wyoming, Colorado, New Mexico, and extreme southeastern Arizona, and probably into Mexico. Males measure  and females  in length. They can be easily identified by the distinctive red stripe which goes down the center of their flat elytra.

Ecology
Like other members of the genus Eleodes, when these beetles feel threatened they raise their abdomen into the air and secrete a foul smelling liquid. Both the larva and adults are herbivorous in nature, eating the seeds of various plants.

References

 ;  (eds.) 1973: Environmental Entomology, Volume 2, Issue 1.

Tenebrionidae
Beetles of the United States
Endemic fauna of the United States
Beetles described in 1823
Taxa named by Thomas Say